Herranz is a surname. Notable people with the surname include:

Antonio López Herranz (1913–1959), Spanish football player and manager
José María Izuzquiza Herranz (1925–2011), Roman Catholic bishop of the Apostolic Vicariate of Jaén en Peru, Peru
Julián Cardinal Herranz Casado (born 1930), Spanish Cardinal of the Roman Catholic Church
María Esther Herranz García (born 1969), Spanish politician and Member of the European Parliament